Remoncourt is a commune in the Meurthe-et-Moselle department in northeastern France.

The village population is 36.  Its elevation is 250 metres; its area is 6.7 km2.

The nearest village is Xousse, located 2.3 km to the west. Remoncourt is administered from Nancy, 62 km to the west.

See also
Communes of the Meurthe-et-Moselle department

References

External links

 Commune de Remoncourt

Communes of Meurthe-et-Moselle